Omar Jamel Phillips (born 1986) is a West Indian cricketer who plays domestically for the Combined Campuses and Colleges (CCC) and has played Test cricket for the West Indies. A left-handed opening batsman, he got his Test opportunity following a dispute between the West Indies Cricket Board and the Players' Association. On his debut against Bangladesh he scored 94.

Career
Phillips was born on 12 October 1986 in Boscobel, Saint Peter, Barbados.
Having previously represented Jamaica at youth level Phillips made his professional debut in October 2007 when appearing for the newly formed Combined Campuses and Colleges. He made his one-day debut against Trinidad and Tobago, opening the batting he scored 34. He made his first-class later in the 2007/08 season against Leeward Islands. During the 2008/09 season he was a regular in the CCC team, playing nine matches and scoring 577 runs at an average of 32.05. This included his maiden century, an innings of 204 against the Leeward Islands which came from 396 balls and included 23 fours and 4 sixes.

Phillips was selected in the West Indies A squad to play Bangladesh in their 2009 tour opener, although he didn't play. On 8 July, he was named in the Test squad following a pay dispute between the West Indies Cricket Board and the Players' Association which led to the first XI boycotting. He made the starting line-up for the first Test at Arnos Vale Stadium, one of seven debutants for the West Indies. In their first innings he top scored with 94, falling six runs short of becoming the sixth Windies batsman to score a century in his first Test innings. He scored 14 in the second innings as the West Indies lost by 95 runs. In the second Test he made 23 and 29 as Bangladesh won again to complete a series victory.

References

External links
Cricinfo Profile

1986 births
Living people
West Indies Test cricketers
Combined Campuses and Colleges cricketers
Barbadian cricketers
Barbados cricketers